Robert Lee Dugger (born July 3, 1995) is an American professional baseball pitcher who is currently a free agent. He has previously played in MLB for the Miami Marlins, Tampa Bay Rays, Seattle Mariners and Cincinnati Reds.

Amateur career
Dugger attended Tomball High School in Tomball, Texas. In 2013, as a senior, he led Tomball to a Texas UIL 4A State Championship, throwing a complete game in which he allowed only one run while striking out six, along with going 3–4 at the plate, including a three-run inside-the-park home run. He was named to the 4A All-State Baseball Team that year. Undrafted out of high school, he enrolled at Cisco Junior College where he played college baseball. In his two years at Cisco, he compiled ERAs of 5.40 and 4.37. After his sophomore year, he transferred to Texas Tech University. As a junior at Texas Tech, he was 6–1 with a 2.67 ERA over  relief innings. After his junior year, he was drafted by the Seattle Mariners in the 18th round of the 2016 Major League Baseball draft.

Professional career

Seattle Mariners
After signing with the Mariners, Dugger was assigned to the Everett AquaSox before being reassigned to the Arizona League Mariners. He also pitched in two games for the Tacoma Rainers. In 12 games (six starts) between the three teams, he went 2–1 with a 4.62 ERA. In 2017, he began the season with the Clinton LumberKings where he compiled a 4–1 record, a 2.00 ERA, and a 0.99 WHIP in 22 games (nine starts) and was named a Midwest League All-Star before being promoted to the Modesto Nuts in July, where he finished the season with a 2–5 record and a 3.94 ERA over nine starts.

Miami Marlins
On December 7, 2017, Dugger, along with Nick Neidert and Christopher Torres, was traded to the Miami Marlins in exchange for Dee Gordon and international slot money. He began 2018 with the Jupiter Hammerheads, earning Florida State League All-Star honors, and was promoted to the Jacksonville Jumbo Shrimp in May. In 25 starts between the two clubs, he pitched to a 10–7 record with a 3.40 ERA. He returned to the Jumbo Shrimp to begin 2019, earning Southern League All-Star honors, before being promoted to the New Orleans Baby Cakes in June.

On August 5, 2019, the Marlins selected Duggar's contract and promoted him to the major leagues. He made his major league debut that day versus the New York Mets, allowing six runs over five innings pitched.

Seattle Mariners (second stint)
On December 7, 2020, Dugger was claimed off waivers by the Seattle Mariners. On February 19, 2021, Dugger was designated for assignment after the signing of Ken Giles was made official. On February 23, Dugger was sent down to the Triple-A level Tacoma Rainers. On April 15, 2021, Dugger was selected to the active 40-man roster ahead of a doubleheader against the Baltimore Orioles. In 12 games for the Mariners in 2021, Dugger posted a 7.36 ERA with 19 strikeouts. On August 22, Dugger was designated for assignment by the Mariners. On August 24, Dugger cleared waivers and was assigned outright to the Triple-A Tacoma Rainers.

Tampa Bay Rays
On March 24, 2022, Dugger signed a minor league deal with the Tampa Bay Rays.
On May 2, 2022 Tampa Bay Rays designated him for assignment.

Cincinnati Reds
On May 4, 2022, the Cincinnati Reds claimed Dugger off waivers.
On May 9, 2022, the Reds designated him for assignment. On May 10, Dugger cleared waivers and was sent outright to the Triple-A Louisville Bats.

On May 12, Dugger was re-selected to the active roster. However, he didn't make an appearance for the Reds before he was designated for assignment again on May 14. On May 16, he cleared waivers and again returned to Louisville.

On July 7, the Reds yet again selected Dugger's contract. On July 8, the Reds designated him for assignment and was sent outright to Triple-A. On October 4, Dugger was once again designated for assignment.

References

External links

Texas Tech Red Raiders bio

1995 births
Living people
Baseball players from Tucson, Arizona
Major League Baseball pitchers
Miami Marlins players
Seattle Mariners players
Tampa Bay Rays players
Cincinnati Reds players
Cisco Wranglers baseball players
Texas Tech Red Raiders baseball players
Arizona League Mariners players
Everett AquaSox players
Clinton LumberKings players
Modesto Nuts players
Tacoma Rainiers players
Jupiter Hammerheads players
Jacksonville Jumbo Shrimp players
New Orleans Baby Cakes players
Durham Bulls players